Aschauer (toponymic surname given to someone who lived near a prominent ash tree) is a surname. Notable people with the surname include: 
 Alexander Aschauer (born 1992), Austrian footballer
 Bernhard Aschauer (born 1945), German luger
 Verena Aschauer (born 1994), Austrian footballer
German-language surnames

Surnames of Austrian origin
Surnames of German origin
German toponymic surnames